Priendes is one of 12 parishes (administrative divisions) in Carreño, a municipality within the province and autonomous community of Asturias, in northern Spain.

The postal code is 33438.

Villages
 Bárzana
 El Cabu
 El Cantu
 Falmuria
 Pesgana
 Pinzales
 Polleo
 El Riistru
 San Pablo

References 

Parishes in Carreño